Extracellular matrix protein 2 is a protein that in humans is encoded by the ECM2 gene.

ECM2 encodes extracellular matrix protein 2, so named because it shares extensive similarity with known extracellular matrix proteins.

References

Further reading

Extracellular matrix proteins